Cameron Jefferson (born May 2, 1992) is an American football offensive tackle. He was on the Denver Broncos' Super Bowl 50 championship team when they defeated the Carolina Panthers.

Professional career

Chicago Bears
Jefferson signed with the Chicago Bears as an undrafted free agent on May 3, 2015. On August 30, 2015, he was waived by the Bears.

Denver Broncos
On December 8, 2015, Jefferson was signed to the Denver Broncos' practice squad.

On February 7, 2016, Jefferson was part of the Broncos team that won Super Bowl 50 over the Carolina Panthers by a score of 24–10.

On February 10, 2016, he signed a reserve/future contract with the Broncos. On August 29, 2016, Jefferson was waived by the Broncos.

Buffalo Bills
On April 7, 2017, Jefferson signed with the Buffalo Bills. He was waived on September 2, 2017.

Washington Redskins
On December 6, 2017, Jefferson was signed to the Washington Redskins' practice squad. He signed a reserve/future contract with the Redskins on January 1, 2018. On August 20, 2018, Jefferson was placed on injured reserve, later being waived with an injury settlement on August 24.

Saskatchewan Roughriders
Jefferson signed a practice roster contract with the Saskatchewan Roughriders of the Canadian Football League (CFL) on June 26, 2019. After the CFL canceled the 2020 season due to the COVID-19 pandemic, Jefferson chose to opt-out of his contract with the Roughriders on August 26, 2020. Jefferson signed with the Conquerors of The Spring League on October 17, 2020, and opted back in to his contract with the Roughriders on January 4, 2021. He was placed on the suspended list on May 20, 2021, to re-join the Conquerors. He was reinstated by the Roughriders on July 3.

References

External links
 Arkansas Razorbacks bio
 Denver Broncos bio

1992 births
Living people
Players of American football from Cleveland
Players of Canadian football from Cleveland
Arkansas Razorbacks football players
American football offensive linemen
Denver Broncos players
Chicago Bears players
Buffalo Bills players
Washington Redskins players
UNLV Rebels football players
Saskatchewan Roughriders players
The Spring League players